Memoirs of a Geisha is a 2005 American epic period drama film directed by Rob Marshall and adapted by Robin Swicord from the 1997 novel of the same name by Arthur Golden. It tells the story of a young Japanese girl, Chiyo Sakamoto, who is sold by her impoverished family to a geisha house to support them by training as and eventually becoming a geisha under the pseudonym "Sayuri Nitta." The film centers around the sacrifices and hardship faced by pre-World War II geisha, and the challenges posed by the war and a modernizing world to geisha society. It stars Zhang Ziyi in the lead role, with Ken Watanabe, Gong Li, Michelle Yeoh, Youki Kudoh, Suzuka Ohgo, and Samantha Futerman.

The film was produced by Steven Spielberg (through production companies Amblin Entertainment and DreamWorks Pictures) and Douglas Wick (through Red Wagon Entertainment). Production was split between southern and northern California and a number of locations in Kyoto, including the Kiyomizu temple and the Fushimi Inari shrine. It was released a limited release in the United States on December 9, 2005 and a wide release on December 23, 2005, by Columbia Pictures and DreamWorks Pictures, with the latter receiving studio credit only.

The film was released to polarized reviews from critics worldwide and was moderately successful at the box office. It was also nominated for and won numerous awards, including nominations for six Academy Awards, and eventually won three: Best Cinematography, Best Art Direction and Best Costume Design. The acting, visuals, sets, costumes, and the musical score (composed by Spielberg's long time collaborator John Williams) were praised, but the film was criticized for casting some non-Japanese actresses as Japanese women and for its style over substance approach. The Japanese release of the film was titled Sayuri, the titular character's geisha name.

Plot
In 1929, Chiyo Sakamoto and her older sister Satsu are sold off by their poor father and taken to Gion, Kyoto. Chiyo is taken in by Kayoko Nitta, known as "Mother", the proprietress of a local ; Satsu, deemed too unattractive, is sent to a brothel instead. Chiyo also meets "Granny" and "Auntie", the other women who run the house; Pumpkin, another young girl; and the 's resident geisha, Hatsumomo.

Pumpkin and Chiyo soon begin their education to become future geisha. Hatsumomo, seeing Chiyo as a potential rival, immediately treats her with abuse. Hoping Chiyo will run away, Hatsumomo tells her where she can find Satsu in the red light district. They make plans to run away the following night. When Chiyo tries to escape via the rooftops, she falls and is injured. As a result, Mother stops investing in Chiyo's geisha training and instead makes her a menial servant to pay off her debts. Satsu flees Kyoto and Chiyo never sees her again.

One day, while crying on a riverbank, Chiyo encounters Chairman Ken Iwamura. He buys her a shaved ice dessert and gives her his handkerchief and some money to cheer her up. Touched by his kindness, Chiyo resolves to become a geisha so that she might become a part of the Chairman's life.

Several years later, Pumpkin debuts as a  under Hatsumomo's tutelage. Shortly afterwards, Chiyo is taken under the wing of Mameha, one of the district's most prominent geisha, who persuades Mother to reinvest in Chiyo's geisha training, promising to pay her twice over after her debut. At a sumo match, Sayuri is reintroduced to the Chairman, but attracts the attention of his gruff business partner Toshikazu Nobu.

Thanks to Mameha's efforts, and in spite of Hatsumomo's scheming, Sayuri rises in popularity; attracting the attention of many men; including Dr. Crab, and the Baron, Mameha's own . In a bidding war for Sayuri's deflowering ceremony, as part of her becoming a full geisha, the winning bid is a record-breaking amount from Dr. Crab.

Upon returning home from the ceremony, Sayuri finds a drunken Hatsumomo in her room, where the latter has found the Chairman's handkerchief. Though the building is saved, Hatsumomo is banished from Gion.

Sayuri's successful career is cut short by the outbreak of World War II. The Chairman relocates her to safety of the countryside, where she works for a kimono maker. After the war ends, Nobu asks Sayuri to help him impress an American Colonel who could approve funding for their business. Sayuri reunites with Mameha, who reluctantly agrees to help Sayuri impress the Colonel, as well as Pumpkin, who is now working as an escort.

Sayuri travels with Nobu, the Chairman, Mameha, Pumpkin, and the American soldiers to the Amami Islands. The Colonel propositions Sayuri, but she rejects him. Nobu confronts Sayuri after seeing this and confesses his desire to become her . Sayuri devises a plan to have Nobu catch her being intimate with the Colonel so that he will lose interest, and enlists Pumpkin's help to do so. However, Pumpkin brings the Chairman instead. When confronted, Pumpkin declares it her revenge for Sayuri being adopted by Mother instead of her. Disheartened, Sayuri decides to give up on her pursuit for the Chairman.

After returning to Gion, Sayuri is summoned to a nearby tea-house. Expecting Nobu, Sayuri is instead surprised to see the Chairman. The Chairman confesses his feelings for her, that he always knew of her identity but refused to interfere with Nobu's feelings out of respect, and that he himself arranged for Mameha to become her mentor. Sayuri is finally able to confess her love to the Chairman and they share a kiss.

Cast

Production

Pre-production
Shortly after the book's release in 1997, the filming rights to the book were purchased for $1 million by Red Wagon's Douglas Wick and Lucy Fisher, backed by Columbia Pictures. The following year, Steven Spielberg planned to make Memoirs of a Geisha as the follow-up to Saving Private Ryan, bringing in his company DreamWorks. Spielberg's DreamWorks partner David Geffen attempted to persuade him not to take the project, feeling it was "not good enough for him". Prior to Spielberg's involvement, the film was planned to be shot in Japan in the Japanese language. By 2002, with Spielberg having postponed production for A.I. Artificial Intelligence, Minority Report and Catch Me If You Can, Spielberg stepped down from directorial duties to only produce.

Both Wick and Fisher approached Rob Marshall, who was interested in doing a non-musical after Annie and Chicago. This brought a third company into Memoirs of a Geisha, as Marshall was still signed to release his next film through Chicago distributors Miramax.

The three leading non-Japanese actresses, including Ziyi Zhang, Gong Li, and Michelle Yeoh, were put through "geisha boot camp" before production commenced, during which they were trained in traditional geisha practices of Japanese music, dance, and tea ceremony. Anthropologist Liza Dalby was also brought in to aid in the production as an advisor, though she later commented that "while the director and producers often asked my opinion on things, most of the time they went ahead and followed their own vision", calling the film a "wasted opportunity" to display geisha society accurately.

Production

Production of the film took place from September 29, 2004 to January 31, 2005. It was decided that contemporary Japan looked too modern for a story set in pre- and post-war Japan, meaning that many scenes were filmed on cost-effective soundstages or on location in the United States, primarily California. The majority of the film was shot on a large set built on a ranch in Thousand Oaks, California. Most interior scenes were filmed in Culver City, California at the Sony Pictures Studios lot. Other locations in California included San Francisco, Moss Beach, Descanso Gardens in La Cañada Flintridge, Sacramento, Yamashiro's Restaurant in Hollywood, the Japanese Gardens at the Huntington Library and Gardens in San Marino, Hakone Gardens in Saratoga, and Downtown Los Angeles at the Belasco Theater on Hill Street. Towards the end of production, some scenes were shot in Kyoto, including the Fushimi Inari-Taisha, the head shrine of Inari, located in Fushimi-ku, Kyoto.

Post-production
One of the tasks faced by sound editors in post-production was improving the English pronunciation of the cast, which in part involved piecing together different dialogue clips from other segments of the film to form missing syllables in the actors' speech, as some only spoke partially phonetic English when performing. The achievement of the sound editors earned the film an Academy Award nomination for Best Achievement in Sound Editing.

Release

Home media
The film debuted on DVD, in both Widescreen and Fullscreen versions, on March 28, 2006. The release was a 2-Disc set, with a second disc dedicated to special features. The film was consequently released on the Blu-ray format on September 25, 2007. The Blu-ray received positive reviews, for the video and audio quality and for porting over every single extra from the 2-Disc DVD release.

Reception
In the Western hemisphere, the film received mixed reviews. In China and Japan, reviews were more negative, with some controversy among audience and critics arising from the film's casting and its relationship to Japan's history.

Western box office and reviews
Memoirs of a Geisha received mixed reviews from Western critics. Illinois' Daily Herald said that the "[s]trong acting, meticulously created sets, beautiful visuals, and a compelling story of a celebrity who can't have the one thing she really wants make Geisha memorable". The Washington Times called the film "a sumptuously faithful and evocative adaption" while adding that "[c]ontrasting dialects may remain a minor nuisance for some spectators, but the movie can presumably count on the pictorial curiosity of readers who enjoyed Mr. Golden's sense of immersion, both harrowing and [a]esthetic, in the culture of a geisha upbringing in the years that culminated in World War II".

On Rotten Tomatoes the film has an approval rating of 35% based on 164 reviews with an average rating of 5.40/10; the consensus stated "Less nuanced than its source material, Memoirs of a Geisha may be a lavish production, but it still carries the simplistic air of a soap opera." On Metacritic, the film has a score of 54 out of 100, based on reviews from 38 critics, meaning "mixed or average review." Audiences surveyed by CinemaScore gave the film a grade "B+" on scale of A to F.

In the United States, the film managed $57 million during its box office run. The film was facing off against King Kong, The Chronicles of Narnia, and Fun with Dick and Jane during the Christmas holiday. On its first week in limited release, the film screening in only eight theaters tallied up an $85,313 per theater average which made it second in highest per theater averages behind Brokeback Mountain for 2005. International gross reached $158 million.

The New Statesman criticized Memoirs of a Geisha'''s plot, saying that after Hatsumomo leaves, "the plot loses what little momentum it had and breaks down into one pretty visual after another" and says that the film version "abandons the original's scholarly mien to reveal the soap opera bubbling below". The Journal praised Ziyi Zhang, saying that she "exudes a heartbreaking innocence and vulnerablity" but said "too much of the character's yearning and despair is concealed behind the mask of white powder and rouge". London's The Evening Standard compared Memoirs of a Geisha to Cinderella and praised Gong Li, saying that "Li may be playing the loser of the piece but she saves this film" and Gong "endows Hatsumomo with genuine mystery". Eighteen days later, The Evening Standard put Memoirs of a Geisha on its Top Ten Films list. Glasgow's Daily Record praised the film, saying the "geisha world is drawn with such intimate detail that it seems timeless until the war, and with it the modern world comes crashing in".

Casting controversy
Controversy arose due to the casting of the film, with all three main female roles going to non-Japanese actresses. Ziyi Zhang (Sayuri) and Gong Li (Hatsumomo) both held Chinese citizenship at the time of the film's production (Gong Li became a naturalised Singaporean from 2008 onwards), whereas Michelle Yeoh (Mameha) is an ethnic Chinese from Malaysia. All three were already prominent actresses in Chinese cinema. The film's producers defended the position, stating that the main priorities in casting the three main roles were "acting ability and star power". Director Rob Marshall noted examples such as the Mexican actor Anthony Quinn being cast as a Greek man in Zorba the Greek.

Opinion of the casting in the Asian community was mixed, with some finding the casting of Chinese actresses for Japanese roles offensive in the face of Japan's wartime atrocities in China and mainland Asia. The Chinese government canceled the film's release because of such connections, and a website denounced star Ziyi Zhang as an "embarrassment to China."

In Japan, reception to the film was mixed. Some Japanese expressed offence at the three main female roles being played by Chinese actresses; others took issue with the portrayal of geisha in the film, deeming it inaccurate and Westernised. Japanese cultural expert Peter MacIntosh, who had advised on the film, expressed concern that it had not been made specifically for a Japanese audience, and that anyone knowledgeable about Japanese culture who saw the film would be "appalled". The film garnered only average box office success in Japan, despite being a high budget film about Japanese culture.

Other Asians defended the casting, including the film's main Japanese star Ken Watanabe, who said that "talent is more important than nationality." In defense of the film, Zhang said:

A director is only interested in casting someone he believes is appropriate for a role...regardless of whether someone is Japanese or Chinese or Korean, we all would have had to learn what it is to be a geisha, because almost nobody today knows what that means—not even the Japanese actors on the film.

Geisha was not meant to be a documentary. I remember seeing in the Chinese newspaper a piece that said we had only spent six weeks to learn everything and that that was not respectful toward the culture. It's like saying that if you're playing a mugger, you have to rob a certain number of people. To my mind, what this issue is all about, though, is the intense historical problems between China and Japan. The whole subject is a land mine. Maybe one of the reasons people made such a fuss about Geisha was that they were looking for a way to vent their anger.

Film critic Roger Ebert pointed out that the film was made by a Japanese-owned company, and that Gong Li and Ziyi Zhang outgrossed any Japanese actress even in the Japanese box office.

Chinese response to the film
The film received occasionally hostile responses in Mainland China, with the film being censored and banned by China. Relations between Japan and Mainland China at the time of the film's release had been particularly tense, owing to the then-Prime Minister of Japan, Junichiro Koizumi, having paid a number of visits to the controversial Yasukuni Shrine - a shrine specially dedicated to honoring Japan's war dead, including those convicted of war crimes. These visits were denounced by China's foreign ministry as having honored war criminals whose crimes pertained to Japan's actions in China in WW2 specifically. China had also prevented Japan from receiving a seat on the United Nations Security Council in the year of the film's release.

The film's setting of the 1920s and 1940s covers both World War II and the Second Sino-Japanese War, during which time Japan captured and forced thousands of Korean and Chinese women into sexual slavery known as "comfort women" for Japanese military personnel. Various newspapers such as the Shanghai-based Oriental Morning Post and the Shanghai Youth Daily expressed fears that the film could be banned by censors, with concerns that the casting of Chinese actresses as geisha could create anti-Japanese sentiment, and stir up resentment surrounding Japan's wartime actions in China - in particular, the use of Chinese women as sex slaves for Japan's occupying forces.

The film had been originally scheduled to be shown within Mainland China on February 9, 2006; however, the Chinese State Administration of Radio, Film, and Television decided to ban the film on February 1, 2006, considering the film "too sensitive" for release, a decision that overturned the film's approval for screening in November.

Prohibition of screening in China
The film was originally scheduled to be approved in November 2005, but in January 2006, the SARFT failed to issue a screening permit. When asked by the reporter whether the film had passed the censorship process, the person in charge of CMPC said "no comment". After 25 January, Memoirs of a Geisha was banned from screening. Mao Yu, director of the Film Council's publicity department, said the film was "sensitive and complex". The media pointed out Zhang Ziyi's role involving the plot of nude and prostitute, and also a scene in which she bathes with a Japanese man as the reason for the ban, and the fact that it was totally unacceptable in China for a Chinese woman to play a Japanese geisha.

Awards and nominations

The film received six Academy Award nominations and won three for Best Art Direction, Best Cinematography, and Best Costume Design. Williams won the Golden Globe Award for Best Original Score and Zhang was nominated for Best Actress in a Motion Picture Drama. Gong Li was named Best Supporting Actress by the National Board of Review. Memoirs of a Geisha earned nine nominations at the Satellite Awards. It was also nominated for six BAFTA Awards.

Soundtrack album

The Memoirs of a Geisha'' official soundtrack featured Yo-Yo Ma performing the cello solos, as well as Itzhak Perlman performing the violin solos. The music was composed and conducted by John Williams, who won his fourth Golden Globe Award for Best Original Score.

 "Sayuri's Theme" – 1:31
 "The Journey to the Hanamachi" – 4:06
 "Going to School" – 2:42
 "Brush on Silk" – 2:31
 "Chiyo's Prayer" – 3:36
 "Becoming a Geisha" – 4:32
 "Finding Satsu" – 3:44
 "The Chairman's Waltz" – 2:39
 "The Rooftops of the Hanamachi" – 3:49
 "The Garden Meeting" – 2:44
 "Dr. Crab's Prize" – 2:18
 "Destiny's Path" – 3:20
 "A New Name... A New Life" – 3:33
 "The Fire Scene and the Coming of War" – 6:48
 "As the Water..." – 2:01
 "Confluence" – 3:42
 "A Dream Discarded" – 2:00
 "Sayuri's Theme and End Credits" – 5:06

References

External links

 
 
 
 

2005 films
2000s historical drama films
2000s historical romance films
2005 romantic drama films
Amblin Entertainment films
American epic films
American historical drama films
American romantic drama films
BAFTA winners (films)
Censored films
China–Japan relations
Columbia Pictures films
Films about geisha
Films based on American novels
Films directed by Rob Marshall
Films produced by Steven Spielberg
Films produced by Douglas Wick
Films produced by Lucy Fisher
Films scored by John Williams
Films with screenplays by Robin Swicord
Films set in the 1920s
Films set in the 1930s
Films set in the 1940s
Films set in Kyoto
Films set in Japan
Films set in the Shōwa period
Films shot in Kyoto Prefecture
Films shot in Sacramento, California
Films shot in San Francisco
Films that won the Best Costume Design Academy Award
Films whose art director won the Best Art Direction Academy Award
Films whose cinematographer won the Best Cinematography Academy Award
American historical romance films
2000s Japanese-language films
Japan in non-Japanese culture
DreamWorks Pictures films
Spyglass Entertainment films
Film controversies
Race-related controversies in film
Casting controversies in film
Works banned in China
2000s English-language films
2000s American films